Brennanstown Portal Tomb, also called Glendruid Dolmen or Cabinteely Dolmen, is a dolmen constructed in Prehistoric Ireland and located in County Dublin. It is a National Monument.

Location

References

Archaeological sites in County Dublin
Dolmens in Ireland